Darya Antonyuk (born 25 January 1996), sometimes transliterated as Daria Antonyuk, is a Russian singer. She is the winner of season five of the Russian version of The Voice.

On 30 December 2016, Antonyuk was declared the winner of season five of The Voice. Throughout her time on the show, she was coached by Russian musician Leonid Agutin.

Life and career
Darya Antonyuk was born on 25 January 1996 in Zelenogorsk, Krasnoyarsk Krai. Her mother, Svetlana Vladimirovna Antonyuk, is a director of the school of additional education for children; her father, Sergei Vladimirovich Antonyuk, is a firefighter. Darya's parents are divorced.

In her childhood she studied ballet and modern choreography, and also studied at a music school. In her native city from the age of 7 Dasha had been studied in the vocal studio "Talisman", and from the young age she has won awards at vocal competitions. At the end of the middle school, in 2014 she came to Moscow, where she successfully passed the exams in four universities, but she stopped her choice at the Moscow Art Theater School (the course of Igor Zolotovitsky). She made her theatrical debut in 2016, Darya played Mary Bennet in A. Frantetti's play "Pride and Prejudice".

The Voice

Darya auditioned in 2016 to compete in season 5 of The Voice. In the blind auditions, broadcast on 9 September 2016 on Channel One, she sang "Stand Up for Love". All four coaches, Dima Bilan, Polina Gagarina, Leonid Agutin, and Grigory Leps turned their chairs. She chose to join Team Leonid.

The Voice performances
 – Studio version of song reached the top performances that week

Discography

Singles

Releases from The Voice
2016: "Stand Up for Love"
2016: "That's What Friends Are For" (with Hagba Brothers)
2016: "Если он уйдёт" ("If He'll Leave Me")
2016: "Колокол" ("The Toller")
2016: "Somebody to Love"
2016: "Твой голос" ("Your Voice") (with Leonid Agutin)
2016: "Without You"
2016: "Дорогой длинною"

References

1996 births
20th-century Russian singers
21st-century Russian singers
Russian pop singers
Living people
People from Zelenogorsk, Krasnoyarsk Krai
The Voice (franchise) winners
20th-century Russian women singers
21st-century Russian women singers
Russian people of Ukrainian descent